The 18th Arabian Gulf Cup 18th edition of the Arabian Gulf Cup. It took place in Abu Dhabi, United Arab Emirates from 17 to 30 January 2007.

The tournament was won by hosts UAE, who beat neighbors Oman 1–0 in the final, courtesy of a goal by Ismail Matar who finished the tournament as top scorer with five goals in all. The UAE became the fifth country to lift the title after Kuwait, Iraq, Qatar and Saudi Arabia.

In the competition there was also some very serious disciplinary problems with a total of 38 yellow cards and 7 red cards awarded in only 12 matches.  As in previous Gulf Cups there have also been bad refereeing calls.

Venues

Squads

Matches

Group A

Group B

Semi finals

Final

Trivia 
 In the beginning 15 minutes of the Oman-Yemen game, the cameras were malfunctioning, resulting in the side cameras being the only coverage of that part of the match.

Winners

Awards

Top-Scorers 

5 goals 
 Ismail Matar

3 goals 
 Yasser Al-Qahtani

2 goals 
 Amad Al Hosni 
 A'ala Hubail
 Hawar Mulla Mohammed 
 Bader Al-Mutawa

1 goal 
 Fahad Al Hamad
 Fahad Al-Rashidi
 Sultan Al-Touqi
 Fawzi Bashir
 Badar Al-Maimani
 Hashim Saleh
 Khalfan Ibrahim
 Ali Hussein
 Malek Mouath
 Faisal Khalil

References

External links 
 Official Site (Arabic)

2007 in Asian football
Arabian Gulf Cup
2007
2006–07 in Emirati football
2006–07 in Yemeni football
2006–07 in Omani football
2006–07 in Bahraini football
2006–07 in Saudi Arabian football
2006–07 in Kuwaiti football
2006–07 in Iraqi football
2006–07 in Qatari football